Chondrolepis uluguru is a species of butterfly in the family Hesperiidae. It is found in the Uluguru Mountains of Tanzania. The habitat consists of submontane areas.

References

Endemic fauna of Tanzania
Insects described in 2012
Hesperiinae